Juan Sesé y Balaguer (1736–1801) was an Aragonese composer and organist born in Calanda in the Spanish comarca of Bajo Aragón. He died in Madrid in 1801.

Some important works
Seis fugas para órgano o clavicordio, Op. 1
Colección de piezas de música para clavicordio, fortepiano y órgano, Op. 6
Preludio, Largo e Intento

Bibliography
Allanegui y Lusarreta, Vicente, Apuntes históricos sobre la Historia de Calanda, Ayuntamiento de Calanda-Parroquia de la Esperanza-Instituto de Estudios Turolenses, 1998.
Bielsa Arbiol, José Antonio, "Sobre Juan de Sesé, compositor calandino. Tras la pista de un ilustre desconocido", Kolenda nº 97, Febrero 2011, Calanda (Teruel), p. 14.

External links
Juan Sesé y Balaguer in Epdlp 
Juan Sesé y Balaguer in Kolenda 

Spanish male classical composers
Spanish Baroque composers
Spanish Roman Catholics
Spanish Classical-period composers
People from Calanda
1736 births
1801 deaths
19th-century Spanish male musicians